Altericroceibacterium  is a genus of Gram-negative bacteria.
The type species is Altericroceibacterium indicum.

References 

Sphingomonadales